Georgia Marie Stanway (born 3 January 1999) is an English professional footballer who plays as an attacking midfielder for Frauen-Bundesliga club Bayern Munich and the England national team. Stanway has also represented England at various youth levels and is widely considered one of the best attacking midfield players of her generation.

In 2016, Stanway was nominated for BBC Young Sports Personality of the Year and was also nominated for PFA Women's Young Player of the Year in 2017. In June 2018, she was named in the UEFA Women's Champions League squad of the season. In 2019, she was awarded PFA Women's Young Player of the Year.

Early life
Stanway was born on 3 January 1999 in Barrow-in-Furness, but moved away at 16 to pursue her football dream. She grew up idolising Alan Shearer and supports Newcastle United. In Manchester, she attended St Bede's College, as teammate Keira Walsh had before her.

Club career

Blackburn Rovers
Stanway started her career at Blackburn Rovers where she played through the youth system and eventually the senior squad playing in the FA Women's Premier League, scoring seven goals in six matches.

Manchester City

On 18 July 2015, Stanway completed a move to Manchester City. On 29 July, Stanway made her senior debut for Manchester City as a substitute in a 5–0 win over Durham in the Continental Cup. On 27 August, she scored her first goal in a 2–0 victory against Everton. She ended her maiden campaign with the club's Rising Star award. In 2016, she won the Nissan Goal of the Season award. In January 2017, she signed a new contract with the club.

Her performances in the 2017–18 season led her to be named in the UEFA Women's Champions League Team of the Season. The following season, she was awarded the PFA Women's Young Player of the Year.

On 17 November 2019, Stanway scored two goals before being sent off, after receiving two yellow cards, in a 5–0 league win against West Ham United. She began the 2020–21 season by scoring a brace in a 2–0 away league win against Aston Villa.

In the first Manchester derby of the 2021–22 season, Stanway received a straight red card for a high challenge on Leah Galton in the 35th minute, with the score at 0–0. Despite this, Manchester City claimed a 2–2 draw. Stanway went on to win the FA WSL Goal of the Month award for December 2021. On 29 January 2022, Stanway became Manchester City's highest women's goalscorer after scoring a hat trick in an 8–0 win against Nottingham Forest in the fourth round of the 2021–22 Women's FA Cup.

Bayern Munich
On 17 May 2022, it was announced that Stanway had signed a three-year deal with Frauen-Bundesliga club Bayern Munich.

She made her debut on 16th August 2022 in a 2–1 friendly win over Barcelona. Stanway scored her first goals for Bayern Munich against Benfica in the Champions League. She received her first Bundesliga yellow card in her first league match for Bayern Munich; by the end of October 2022, Deutsche Welle noted that Stanway's time in the club had been "characterized more by yellow cards than goals".

International career

Youth
In 2016, Stanway captained the England under-17 team to third at the 2016 Euros, qualifying for the World Cup. In 2018, Stanway played a pivotal role in England's 2018 FIFA U-20 Women's World Cup campaign in France. Stanway scored six times (same as Golden Boot winner Patricia Guijarro but beaten only on assists) as England went on to finish third.

Senior
Stanway scored her first England goal, on her debut, in a 3–0 friendly victory against Austria on 8 November 2018. Stanway scored her second international goal in a 2–1 defeat to Norway in September 2019. On 27 May 2021 it was announced that Stanway had been selected as one of five strikers in the Great Britain women's Olympic football team for the delayed 2020 Olympics.

In June 2022 Stanway was included in the England squad which won the UEFA Women's Euro 2022, scoring the winner with a "22-yard rocket of a shot" in England's 2–1 win over Spain in the quarter-final. Stanway played 89 minutes in the final win over Germany.

Personal life
Stanway is in a relationship with Toulouse Olympique rugby league footballer Olly Ashall-Bott. In Olympique's first match following England's victory in Euro 2022, Stanway was involved in the pitch side punditry for Sky Sports.

Career statistics

Club
.

International

International goals

Honours
Manchester City
 FA Women's Super League: 2016
 Women's FA Cup: 2016–17, 2018–19, 2019–20
 FA Women's League Cup: 2016, 2018–19, 2021–22

England U17
 UEFA Women's Under-17 Championship third place: 2016

England U20
FIFA U-20 Women's World Cup third place: 2018

England

UEFA Women's Championship: 2022
SheBelieves Cup: 2019
Arnold Clark Cup: 2022, 2023

Individual
UEFA Women's Under-17 Championship Team of the Tournament: 2016
FIFA U-20 Women's World Cup Silver Boot: 2018
PFA Women's Young Player of the Year: 2018–19
 FA Women's Super League Goal of the Month: December 2021
Freedom of the City of London (announced 1 August 2022)

References

External links

 Profile  at the Manchester City F.C. website
 Profile at the Football Association website
 
 
 

1999 births
Living people
English expatriate sportspeople in Germany
Expatriate women's footballers in Germany
Frauen-Bundesliga players
English women's footballers
England women's youth international footballers
England women's international footballers
Olympic footballers of Great Britain
Women's association football forwards
Women's Super League players
Manchester City W.F.C. players
Footballers from Barrow-in-Furness
2019 FIFA Women's World Cup players
Footballers at the 2020 Summer Olympics
Footballers from Cumbria
UEFA Women's Euro 2022 players
UEFA Women's Championship-winning players
Footballers educated at St Bede's College, Manchester